Thomas McHale (February 25, 1963 – May 25, 2008) was an American football player.  He played professionally as an offensive guard in the National Football League (NFL) with the Tampa Bay Buccaneers (1987–1992), Philadelphia Eagles (1993–1994) and Miami Dolphins (1995). Born in Gaithersburg, Maryland, he attended Gaithersburg High School and then Wyoming Seminary in Kingston, Pennsylvania, before playing college football at Maryland (1983) and Cornell (1986), graduating from the Cornell University School of Hotel Administration. Playing as a defensive end, he was named all-Ivy League and first-team All-American in 1986, and was runner-up for Ivy League Player of the Year. He was named to the Cornell Athletic Hall of Fame in 1993.

Death
On the morning of May 25, 2008, McHale was found dead at age 45 at the home of a friend in Wesley Chapel, Florida. The cause of death was recorded as an accidental drug overdose.

An examination of McHale's brain at Boston University's School of Medicine found that McHale had chronic traumatic encephalopathy (CTE), a condition found in several other NFL veterans who had received repeated concussions. His widow, Lisa McHale, now works as a family relations liaison at the Boston University CTE Center.

References

1963 births
2008 deaths
American football offensive guards
American football players with chronic traumatic encephalopathy
Cornell Big Red football players
Maryland Terrapins football players
Miami Dolphins players
Philadelphia Eagles players
Tampa Bay Buccaneers players
Cornell University School of Hotel Administration alumni
People from Gaithersburg, Maryland
Players of American football from Maryland
Georgetown Preparatory School alumni
Accidental deaths in Florida
Drug-related deaths in Florida
Gaithersburg High School alumni